A list of musical acts who belong to the glam punk subgenre of glam rock and protopunk music.

Glitter punk roots: 1968–1979

  Alice Cooper
   The Arrows
   The Brats
   Cherry Vanilla
   Corpse Grinders
   Cuddly Toys
   David Bowie
   Doctors of Madness
   Harlots of 42nd Street
   Hollywood Brats
   Iggy Pop
   Japan (early)
   Jayne County
   Jet
   Johnny Thunders
   Lou Reed
   Magic Tramps
   Milk 'N' Cookies
   Misspent Youth
   New York Dolls
   Neon Leon
   Rags
   Razor Boys
   Ruby and the Rednecks
   The Runaways
   Shady Lady
   Sensational Alex Harvey Band
   Slaughter & The Dogs
   Sparks
   The Stooges (1971–1974)
   Teenage Lust & The Lustettes
   T. Rex
   Ultravox
   Zolar X

Glam punk aftermath: 1980–present
1980s

   Andy McCoy
   Backyard Babies
   Bad Losers
   The Dogs D'Amour
   Factory (band)
   Fallen Angels
   Faster Pussycat
   The Ghosts of Lovers
   Gunfire Dance
   Jetboy
   Joan Jett & the Blackhearts
   The Joneses
   The Lords of the New Church
   Michael Monroe
   Redd Kross (later)
   René Berg
   The Throbs
   Mother Love Bone
   Motorcycle Boy
   Smack
   Soho Roses
   Star Star
   The Suicide Twins
   The 69 Eyes (early)

1990s

   D Generation
   Frankenstein Drag Queens from Planet 13
   Flash Bastard
   The Hot Dogs
  Manic Street Preachers
   The Mystery Addicts
   The Orphan Punks
  Pure Rubbish
   Richmond Sluts
   Road Vultures
   The Seaweed Eaters
   Shooting Gallery
   Slash City Daggers
   Toilet Böys
 Turbonegro

2000–present

   Bare Wires
   Billy Boy on Poison
   Biters
 The Exploding Hearts
   The Featherz
   The Heart Attacks
  Leaded Fuel
   Prima Donna
 Sparkling Bombs
   Towers of London

   The Urgencies

See also
List of punk artists
List of glam rock artists

References

Lists of punk bands